The Mannum–Adelaide pipeline is a water pipeline in South Australia. It was the first major pipeline built from the River Murray to serve Adelaide. The pipeline project was started in 1949 and completed in March 1955. After suffering water restrictions every summer from 1949 to 1954, in the summer of 1957–1958 Adelaide was the only mainland capital not subject to restrictions.

The pipeline, 60 kilometres long, goes from Mannum to Hope Valley. Off takes supply the Warren Reservoir transfer main, Little Para Reservoir dissipater and the treatment plants at Mannum, Palmer, Mt Pleasant and Anstey Hill. It is one of only two major pipelines in South Australia to supply Adelaide water from the River Murray, the other being the Murray Bridge-Onkaparinga Pipeline. They are also the only two that are used for bulk raw water transfer.

From 2019, SA Water is seeking to reduce operating costs by installing a solar panel array to provide power for each pumping station on the route. Solar farms for Pipeline Pumping Station 2 (PPS.2) and PPS.3 are both installed in the Palmer area.

References

Pipelines in South Australia
1955 establishments in Australia
History of Adelaide
Freshwater pipelines
Economic history of South Australia